Poios Thanas(s)is (Who Is Thanassis) is a 1969 Greek drama/comedy film directed and written by Thanassis Vengos and starring himself, Anna Fonsou and Vangelos Ploios.  The film marks the debut of Emilia Ipsilandi.

Plot
Thanassis Trikorfos (Vengos) is a polite and compassionate electrical appliance dealer, who helps and serves worldwide, even when he himself is in difficulty. He hires the graceful Stella (Fonsou), who needs the money since her card player friend Alekos (Ploios) ends up betting away everything she earns.

Thanassis, who has been unhappy, becomes fascinated with Stella's shrewdness and good heart.  He falls in love with her, and his happiness returns. Stella feels the same way, but has to conceal it for fear of her boyfriend's reaction.

When the kind and trusting Thanassis learns the woman he loves is already engaged, his wounded heart hardens and he becomes distant.  From a gallant shop owner he becomes a shrewish, domineering and demanding merchant.

Meanwhile, two of his friends (Takis Miliadis and Giorgos Velentzas) are attempting to persuade him to cooperate with secular businesswoman Margaret Kerani (Ipsilandi), whose ultimate aim is to take over the shop.

Stella, who overhears the conversation and discovers the "good friends" preparing to set the trap for Thanassis, frustrates their plans at the last moment. Because of this behavior, her love for Thanassis is finally revealed.

The film blends comedy with emotional elements and ends happily.

Cast
Thanassis Vengos - Thanassis Trikorfos
Anna Fonsou - Stella
Vangelis Ploios - Alekos
Giorgios Velentzas - Pantelis
Nasos Kedrakas - Prokopis
Nitsa Marouda - Elpida Trikorfou
Sassa Kazelli - Stella
Emilia Ipsilandi - Margaret Koraki
Takis Miliadis - Fondas
Giorgos Tzifos - Pelopidas
Stavros Xenidis
Rena Pashalidou - Hatzimousouri
Kaiti Sigala

External links

1969 films
1960s Greek-language films
1969 comedy films
Greek comedy films